Neritina asperulata is a species of a marine and  freshwater snail, an aquatic gastropod mollusk in the family Neritidae, the nerites.

Distribution
This species occurs in the Philippines and on the Solomon Islands.

Ecology
Neritina asperulata is an amphidromous species.

Juvenile snails of Neritina asperulata attach to a shell of another neritid snail Neritina pulligera and migrate like this for several kilometers.

References

 Abdou, A.; Galzin, R.; Lord, C.; Denis, G. P. J. & Keith, P. (2017). Revision of the species complex 'Neritina pulligera' (Gastropoda, Cycloneritimorpha: Neritidae) using taxonomy and barcoding. Vie et Milieu. 67 (3-4): 149-161

External links
 Récluz, C. A. (1843). Descriptions of new species of Nerites, collected by Mr. Cuming in the Philippine Islands. Proceedings of the Zoological Society of London. (1842) 10: 168-176
  Martens, E. von. (1863-1879). Die Gattung Neritina. In: Küster, H. C.; Kobelt, W., Weinkauff, H. C., Eds. Systematisches Conchylien-Cabinet von Martini und Chemnitz. Neu herausgegeben und vervollständigt. Zweiten Bandes zehnte Abtheilung. 1-303, pls A, 1-23. Nürnberg: Bauer & Raspe
 Récluz, C. A. (1843). Descriptions of new species of Nerites, collected by Mr. Cuming in the Philippine Islands. Proceedings of the Zoological Society of London. (1842) 10: 168-176

Neritidae
Gastropods described in 1843
Taxobox binomials not recognized by IUCN